Uncle Charlie is the fourth studio album by American singer Charlie Wilson. It was released by Jive Records on February 17, 2009. It features production from Gregg Pagani, The Underdogs, Bigg D, T-Pain and Los da Mystro. It features guest appearances from Snoop Dogg, Jamie Foxx and T-Pain. It debuted and peaked at number two on the US Billboard 200 with first week sales of 58,000 copies.  At the 52nd Grammy Awards, Uncle Charlie was nominated for Best R&B Album, while the single "There Goes My Baby" was nominated for Best Male R&B Vocal Performance.

Track listing

Notes
  denotes co-producer

Sample credits
"Shawty Come Back" contains a portion of the composition "Baby Come Back" as written by Peter Beckett.
"There Goes My Baby" contains a portion of the composition "Would You Please Be Mine" as written by Kenneth Copeland and Marvin Eugene Smith.
"Let It Out" contains a portion of the composition "Early in the Morning" as written by Lonnie Simmons, Rudolph Taylor and Charlie Wilson.

Charts

Weekly charts

Year-end charts

References

External links
 

2009 albums
Albums produced by T-Pain
Albums produced by the Underdogs (production team)